Rochefortia acrantha is a species of plant in the family Boraginaceae. It is endemic to Jamaica.

References

acrantha
Vulnerable plants
Endemic flora of Jamaica
Taxonomy articles created by Polbot